Magnum, in comics, may refer to:

 Magnum, a member of the Elementals in Marvel Comics
 Moses Magnum, a Marvel Comics villain

See also
 Magnum (disambiguation)
 Magnus (comics)

References